The Ulaan Ovoo Coal Mine , red mound) is a coal mine located in the Tüshig sum of Selenge aimag in northern Mongolia. It is located on the northern shore of the Zelter River a short distance west of the sum center.

The mine has coal reserves amounting to 208.8 million tonnes of brown coal.

References 

Coal mines in Mongolia